Give and Take is a lost 1928 American silent comedy film directed by William Beaudine. It was Universal's second sound film.

Plot
A recent college graduate convinces his father to adapt social democracy in the father's manufacturing plant so that workers share in profits and have a role in managing operations.

Cast
 Jean Hersholt as Factory owner, John Bauer
 George Sidney as Plant Foreman
 George J. Lewis as 'Jack' Bauer Jr.
 Sharon Lynn as Foreman's Daughter
 Sam Hardy as Industrialist
 Rhoda Cross as Nancy
 Charles Hill Mailes as Drumm (as Charles Mailes)

References

External links
 

1928 films
1928 comedy films
Silent American comedy films
American silent feature films
American black-and-white films
Films directed by William Beaudine
Lost American films
Universal Pictures films
1928 lost films
Lost comedy films
1920s American films